I. aemula  may refer to:

 Idia aemula, the common idia, powdered snout or waved tabby, a moth species found from Canada south to Florida and Texas and in most of Eurasia
 Inquisitor aemula, a sea snail species

See also
 Aemula